Spermacoce glabra, smooth false buttonweed, is a New World species of plants in the coffee family.

The species is widespread across much of North America and South America. In the United States, it is found in the southern part of the Mississippi Valley from Illinois to Louisiana, the range extending westward into Texas, Oklahoma and eastern Kansas, and eastward along the Ohio River. Isolated populations are reported from farther east, in Maryland, Virginia, South Carolina, Georgia and Florida. The species also occurs in southern Mexico (Tabasco and Campeche), Honduras, and South America (Colombia, Venezuela, Ecuador, Brazil, Paraguay, Uruguay and Argentina).

References

External links
photo of entire plant
United StatesDepartment of Agriculture Plants Profile
photo of herbarium specimen at Missouri Botanical Garden, collected in Missouri,Spermacoce glabra
Alabama Plant Atlas
All Things Plant, Photo of the bloom of Smooth False Buttonweed (Spermacoce glabra) posted by purpleinopp
Plants of the Río Grande Delta
Gardening Europe
Cyberflora Louisiana 
Sagebud, Grow Your Garden, Smooth False Buttonweed (Spermacoce glabra)
Wildflowers of the Escambia Region (western Florida), False Smooth Buttonweed 

glabra
Flora of North America
Flora of Central America
Flora of South America
Plants described in 1803
Taxa named by André Michaux